Marcos Poggi (born 31 August 1987) is a Spanish rugby sevens player. He was selected for 's 2013 Rugby World Cup Sevens squad. In 2016, he was named in 's rugby sevens team for the Rio Olympics. He was part of the team that won the 2016 Men's Rugby Sevens Final Olympic Qualification Tournament that was held in Monaco.

References

External links 
 

1987 births
Living people
Rugby sevens players at the 2016 Summer Olympics
Olympic rugby sevens players of Spain
Spain international rugby sevens players